In the Latter Day Saint movement, the Presiding Patriarch (also called Presiding Evangelist, Patriarch over the Church, Patriarch of the Church, or Patriarch to the Church) is a church-wide leadership office within the priesthood. Among the duties of the Presiding Patriarch are to preside in council meetings, ordain other patriarchs, and administer patriarchal blessings.

Originally, the office of Presiding Patriarch was one of the highest and most important offices of the church's priesthood. The role was equated by Joseph Smith with Biblical patriarchs from Adam to Abraham, Isaac, and Jacob, and it was expected that the office would descend through lineal succession from father to son. This precedent was set when Hyrum Smith, Joseph's brother, became the second Presiding Patriarch because he was the eldest surviving son of the first Presiding Patriarch, Joseph Smith Sr. When the office was given to Hyrum, he was given "keys of the patriarchal priesthood over the kingdom of God on earth, even the Church of the Latter Day Saints." Thus, some have argued that Presiding Patriarch is an office of the Patriarchal Priesthood. However, the existence and meaning of the Patriarchal Priesthood is controversial and uncertain.

Community of Christ

In the major denominations of the Latter Day Saint movement, the role of the Presiding Patriarch diminished substantially after the death of Hyrum Smith. Today, Community of Christ, formerly the Reorganized Church of Jesus Christ of Latter Day Saints (RLDS), ordains a Presiding Evangelist who plays an important role as a world church leader, but it is not required that the person be a descendant of Joseph Smith's family. That tradition was discontinued in 1958 when RLDS Prophet-Presidents W. Wallace Smith, a grandson of Joseph Smith, presented Roy Cheville as a successor to Elbert A. Smith. Unlike Elbert A. Smith, Cheville was not a descendant of Joseph Smith Sr. Prior to 1984, Presiding Patriarch and Presiding Evangelist were used interchangeably for the one presiding over the Order of Evangelists. In 1984, the Community of Christ dropped its use of the name Presiding Evangelist for this role, along with the change of name of the local office from Evangelist-Patriarch to simply Evangelist. The current Presiding Evangelist of Community of Christ is Jane M. Gardner.

Role within Community of Christ

Within the international leadership Councils, Quorums, and Orders of the Community of Christ, the Presiding Evangelist serves as a spiritual companion, counselor and guide to the church and its leaders, and to the Order of Evangelists in fulfilling the significant ministry they provide, especially what the church considers "a time of transformation and change.”

According to the church, Evangelists are ordained to be ministers of blessing, witnessing of Jesus Christ and responsive to the reconciling and redeeming influence of the Holy Spirit in the lives of persons, serving in multiple ministries according to the unique gifts and callings of each evangelist.

Chronology of the Presiding Patriarchs/Evangelist of Community of Christ

The Church of Jesus Christ of Latter-day Saints

When a Presiding Patriarch has existed, The Church of Jesus Christ of Latter-day Saints (LDS Church) has sustained the person as a prophet, seer, and revelator.  In the church's history, there have been eight Presiding Patriarchs, three Acting Presiding Patriarchs, and one Patriarch Emeritus.

The LDS Church effectively discontinued the office of Presiding Patriarch in 1979, indicating enough local patriarchs existed so that the church-wide position was no longer needed. However, E. Gary Smith, the eldest son of the final patriarch, Eldred G. Smith, rejected this explanation, suggesting instead that the dissolution of the office was the inevitable result of longstanding tensions rising from the incompatibility of a hereditary position with the broader church hierarchy based in "office charisma," consistent with the Weberian model of bureaucracy.   Until that time, the role and duties of the office had varied.  The Presiding Patriarch sometimes appointed local patriarchs in the church's stakes and presided over them as a loose "Quorum of Patriarchs."  Like the local patriarchs, the Presiding Patriarch was also empowered to give patriarchal blessings.

Chronology of the Presiding Patriarchs of the LDS Church

See also

Lineal succession (Latter Day Saints)
Patriarch (Latter Day Saints)
Patriarchal priesthood

Notes

References
.
.
Peggy Fletcher Stack, "Century Mark: Church leader with historic position nears 100th birthday", Salt Lake Tribune, December 29, 2006.

History of the Latter Day Saint movement
Latter Day Saint hierarchy
Leadership positions in the Church of Jesus Christ of Latter-day Saints
 
 

1833 establishments in the United States
1833 in Christianity